The 1927–28 season was Manchester United's 32nd season in the Football League.

First Division

FA Cup

References

Manchester United F.C. seasons
Manchester United